Walby is a hamlet in the civil parish of Stanwix Rural, in the Carlisle district, in the county of Cumbria, England. It is a few miles away from the city of Carlisle and near the hamlet of Linstock. It is on Willow Beck near the River Eden and is about half a mile away from the main A689 road. It has an open farm. Circa 1870, it had a population of 40 as recorded in the Imperial Gazetteer of England and Wales. The surname derives from the place.

References 

Hamlets in Cumbria
City of Carlisle